Erik Oskar Severin (18 July 1879 – 15 November 1942) was a Swedish curler who won a silver medal at the 1924 Winter Olympics in Chamonix. He was a banker by profession.

References

1879 births
1942 deaths
Sportspeople from Stockholm
Swedish male curlers
Olympic curlers of Sweden
Olympic silver medalists for Sweden
Curlers at the 1924 Winter Olympics
Medalists at the 1924 Winter Olympics
Olympic medalists in curling